The West Texas Historical Association is an organization of both academics and laypersons dedicated to the preservation and dissemination of the total history of West Texas, loosely defined geographically as all Texas counties and portions of counties located west of Interstate 35.

See also
 Texas State Historical Association

External links
 

Historical societies in Texas
Organizations established in 1924
Professional associations based in the United States
Texas Tech University
Organizations based in Lubbock, Texas